Quality Time is a 2017 Dutch drama film directed by Daan Bakker. It was shortlisted by the EYE Film Institute Netherlands as one of the eight films to be selected as the potential Dutch submission for the Academy Award for Best Foreign Language Film at the 90th Academy Awards. However, it was not selected, with Layla M. being chosen as the Dutch entry.

Cast

 Noel Keulen
 Thomas Aske Berg
 Giulio D'Anna
 Steve Aernouts

References

External links
 

2017 films
2017 drama films
Dutch drama films
2010s Dutch-language films
2010s Norwegian-language films
2017 directorial debut films
2017 multilingual films
Dutch multilingual films